The 2015 Geneva Open was a men's tennis tournament played on outdoor clay courts. It was the 1st edition of the Geneva Open and part of the ATP World Tour 250 series of the 2015 ATP World Tour. It took place at the Tennis Club de Genève in Geneva, Switzerland, from May 17 through May 23, 2015.

Singles main-draw entrants

Seeds 

 Rankings are as of May 11, 2015.

Other entrants 
The following players received wildcards into the singles main draw:
  Marin Čilić
  Andrey Rublev
  Janko Tipsarević

The following players received entry from the qualifying draw:
  Damir Džumhur
  Andrey Kuznetsov
  Adrian Mannarino
  Lukáš Rosol

Withdrawals 
Before the tournament
  Steve Darcis →replaced by Jan-Lennard Struff
  Marcel Granollers →replaced by Ričardas Berankis
  Vasek Pospisil →replaced by Thomaz Bellucci
  Radek Štěpánek →replaced by Teymuraz Gabashvili

Doubles main-draw entrants

Seeds 

 Rankings are as of May 11, 2015.

Other entrants 
The following pairs received wildcards into the doubles main draw:
  Henri Laaksonen /  Luca Margaroli 
  Janko Tipsarević /  Mikhail Youzhny

The following pair received entry as alternates:
  Carlos Berlocq /  João Souza

Withdrawals 
Before the tournament
  Janko Tipsarević

Finals

Singles 

  Thomaz Bellucci defeated  João Sousa, 7–6(7–4), 6–4

Doubles 

  Juan Sebastián Cabal /  Robert Farah defeated  Raven Klaasen /  Lu Yen-hsun, 7–5, 4–6, [10–7]

References

External links 
 Official website